The Dragon is a studio album by the Greek electronic composer Vangelis, unofficially released in 1978.

Background
After the break-up of Aphrodite's Child, Vangelis wanted to relocate to London. Producer Giorgio Gomelsky introduced him to some other musicians and put together a collaborative project which was funded by French free jazz record label BYG records with the intention of releasing an album. Two albums' worth of material had resulted from these sessions, but were unfinished and never intended for release.

Some years later, Charly Records took over the catalogue of the bankrupt BYG records and released the recordings as album The Dragon and Hypothesis in 1978 without the approval of the performers. The sleeve was made by Terry Oakes. In Germany Hypothesis and The Dragon were issued together as a double album titled Portrait. Vangelis subsequently took the label to court to have both albums taken off the market and won the case.

Recording and personnel
Apart from Vangelis (who played the keyboards), the line-up consisted of long-term musical collaborator Arghiris (Anargyros Koulouris) (guitar), and session musicians Michel Ripoche (violin), Brian Odgers (bass), Micky Waller (drums). The sessions were recorded in London's Marquee Studios by Giorgio Gomelsky. According to Gomelsky, 'The idea was to find "grooves" that could lead into long, (Sufi)trance-like but evolving rhythmic patterns with a lot of improvisation on top'.

Vangelis - keyboards
Anargyros Koulouris – electric and acoustic guitars
Brian Odger – bass guitars
Micky Waller – drums, percussion
Michel Ripoche - violin

Reception

Steven McDonald at Allmusic notes that although the album was mainly released to cash in on Vangelis' popularity, it contains elements of both Aphrodite's Child and Vangelis' upcoming solo work. Vangelis himself noted that the sessions were bad and he doesn't agree with such music.

Track listing

References

Vangelis albums
1978 albums
Albums produced by Giorgio Gomelsky